The 2014–15 Alabama State Hornets basketball team represented Alabama State University during the 2014–15 NCAA Division I men's basketball season. The Hornets, led by tenth year head coach Lewis Jackson, played their home games at the Dunn–Oliver Acadome as members of the Southwestern Athletic Conference. They finished the season 19–10, 14–4 in SWAC play to finish in second place. Due to Academic Progress Rate penalties, the Hornets were ineligible for the postseason. However, they were allowed to participate in the SWAC tournament where they advanced to the semifinals where they lost to Southern.

Roster

Schedule and results
Source: 

|-
!colspan=8 style="background:#000000; color:#FFD700;"| Regular season

|-
!colspan=8 style="background:#000000; color:#FFD700;"| SWAC tournament

References

Alabama State
Alabama State Hornets basketball seasons
Alabama State Horn
Alabama State Horn